Lu Jiajing (born 18 November 1989) is a Chinese tennis player.

She has won 18 singles and 28 doubles titles on the ITF Circuit. On 18 March 2019, she reached her career-high singles ranking of world No. 162. On 29 June 2015, she peaked at No. 139 in the doubles rankings. 

Partnering Wang Yafan, Lu won her first $50k tournament at Xi'an, defeating Liang Chen and Yang Zhaoxuan in the 2014 final. She also won the doubles title at the Delhi Open in 2014.

WTA career finals

Doubles: 1 (runner-up)

ITF Circuit finals

Singles: 27 (18 titles, 9 runner–ups)

Doubles: 53 (28 titles, 25 runner–ups)

Notes

References

External links

 
 

1989 births
Living people
Sportspeople from Shenyang
Chinese female tennis players
Tennis players from Liaoning
21st-century Chinese women